Chen Wentong (5 April 1924 – 22 January 2009), better known by his pen name Liang Yusheng, was a Chinese-born Australian novelist best known for being a pioneer of the "new school" of the wuxia genre in the 20th century. Along with Jin Yong and Gu Long, he was one of the best known wuxia writers in the later half of the 20th century. Throughout his career, he published a total of 35 wuxia novels – the more notable ones include Baifa Monü Zhuan, Yunhai Yugong Yuan, Qijian Xia Tianshan and Pingzong Xiaying Lu – and some have been adapted into films and television series, including The Bride with White Hair (1993) and Seven Swords (2005).

Pen name 
Chen's given name "Wentong" means "literary tradition". He chose Liang as the surname of his pen name to remind himself that he was inheriting the literary tradition of his ancestors in the same way the Chen dynasty (557–589) succeeded the Liang dynasty (502–557) during the Northern and Southern dynasties period (420–589). He chose "Yusheng" as the given name of his pen name to pay homage to Gong Baiyu, one of his favourite wuxia writers and sources of influence, because "Yusheng" means "born from (Gong Bai)yu".

Early life 
Chen was born in 1924 in a scholarly family in Tunzhi Village, Wenyu Town, Mengshan County, Guangxi Province, China. He was well-versed in ancient Chinese classics and duilian and could recite the Three Hundred Tang Poems by the age of eight. While he was attending Guilin High School in Guilin, he enjoyed writing poems.

Following the outbreak of the Second Sino-Japanese War in 1937, Chen left Guilin and returned to Mengshan County. During this time, he met two scholars from the neighbouring Guangdong Province who had taken shelter in Mengshan County, and studied history and literature under their tutelage: Jian Youwen, who specialised in the history of the Taiping Rebellion; and Rao Zongyi, who was well read in poetry, humanities, art and the history of Dunhuang.

After the war ended, Chen attended Lingnan University in Guangzhou and graduated in 1948, majoring in international economics.

Career in Hong Kong 
In 1949, Chen moved to Hong Kong and, through a recommendation from Lingnan University, became an assistant editor for the newspaper Ta Kung Pao. He was subsequently promoted to editor and also became a member of the newspaper's editorial executive committee. Towards the end of 1950, he was reassigned to New Evening Post, the evening edition of Ta Kung Pao.

On 17 January 1954, two martial arts masters – Chan Hak-fu of the White Crane School and Wu Kung-i of the Tai Chi School – challenged each other to a lei tai match in Macau and attracted much attention in Hong Kong. Luo Fu, the chief editor of New Evening Post, wanted to take advantage of the sensationalism surrounding the lei tai match, so he asked Chen to write a wuxia story based on the match and publish it as a serial in the newspaper. This became Chen's debut wuxia novel – Longhu Dou Jinghua – and marked the start of a "new school" in the wuxia genre. During this time, he met Jin Yong, who was also working at New Evening Post and writing wuxia novels.

From 1954 to 1983, Chen wrote a total of 35 wuxia novels, of which most were originally published as serials in newspapers. Among his works, Baifa Monü Zhuan, Yunhai Yugong Yuan, Qijian Xia Tianshan and Pingzong Xiaying Lu are some of the better known ones and have been adapted into films and television series, including The Bride with White Hair (1993) and Seven Swords (2005). Besides wuxia novels, Chen also wrote columns, critiques and essays under different pen names, including "Liang Hueru" and "Fong Yuning".

Retirement and death 
Chen migrated to Australia with his family in 1987. At the time, he was a member of the China Writers Association and had been offered the position of honorary president of the Yinglian Society of China (YSC) in Shenzhen. He converted to Christianity in September 1994.

On 30 November 2004, Chen received an honorary Doctor of Arts from his alma mater, Lingnan University, which has moved to Hong Kong, for his contributions to the development of literature.

In December 2006, while attending an event in Hong Kong to celebrate Cosmos Books Ltd.'s 30th anniversary, Chen suffered a stroke. After that, he returned to Australia and spent his time recuperating at the Bernard Chan Nursing Home in Burwood, New South Wales. On 22 January 2009, he died of natural causes at the age of 84 in Sydney. Among those who wrote tributes to Chen were his mentor Rao Zongyi, his former boss Luo Fu, fellow wuxia writer Jin Yong, and professor Chan Yiu-nam.

Writing style 
Chen's novels always open with a poem – indicating his interest in poetry. The protagonists of his novels also tend to be multi-talented, versatile, and well-read. Besides that, he incorporates elements of Chinese history in his novels – a style also adopted by fellow wuxia writer Jin Yong. However, unlike Jin Yong and other wuxia writers, he does not regard the Shaolin and Wudang schools as the major orthodox schools in the jianghu (martial artists' community). Instead, he makes the Mount Heaven School (Tianshan School) the leading school in the jianghu, particularly in the Tianshan series of novels set in the Ming and Qing dynasties.

Works

Adaptations 
 Seven Swordsman Leave Tianshan 七劍下天山 (1959)
 The Jade Bow 雲海玉弓緣  (1966)
 Chronicles of the Shadow Swordsman 萍蹤俠影錄 (1977)
 To Kill the Big Villain in Mt. Tai 泰山屠龍 (1980)
 White Hair Devil Lady 白发魔女传 (1980)
 The Spy in the Palace 飛鳳潛龍 (1981)
 Jade Bow Connections 雲海玉弓緣 (1984)
 Chronicles of the Shadow Swordsman 萍蹤俠影錄 (1985)
 The Romance of the White Hair Maiden (1986 TV series)
 Revenge of Swordsmanship  還劍奇情 (1986)
 The Bride with White Hair 白发魔女传(1993) 
 The Bride with White Hair 2 白发魔女传2(1993) 
 The Romance of the White Hair Maiden (1995 TV series)
 Legend of the White Hair Brides 塞外奇侠 (1996 TV series)
 Romance of the White Haired Maiden (TV series) 白发魔女 (1999)
 Heroic Legend 萍踪侠影 (2003)
 Seven Swords 七剑 (2005)
 Seven Swordsmen 七剑下天山 (2006)
 Vagabond Vigilante (2006)
 Paladins in Troubled Times 大唐游侠传 (2008)
 The Patriotic Knights 侠骨丹心 (2010)
 Tracking Knights Phantom (2011)
 The Bride with White Hair (TV series) 新白发魔女传 (2012)
 The White Haired Witch of Lunar Kingdom 白发魔女传之明月天国 (2014)
 The Seven Swords (movie trilogies) (2018-2020)
 The White Haired Witch 白发魔女外传 (2020)
 The First Sword of Wudang 武当一剑 (2021)

See also
 Jin Yong
 Gu Long

References

External links
 Liang Yusheng
 Liang Yusheng – The Pioneer
 The Wanderer Chronicles (萍踪侠影录) – Read a chapter-by-chapter English summary of Liang Yusheng's Pingzong Xiaying Lu (via WuxiaSociety2 – formerly known as Wuxiamania)
 Seven Swords Novel Translation English summary translation of Qijian Xia Tianshan'' (updated 27 August 2007) done by Yenchin of Wuxiasociety.org
 
 Liang Yusheng (HKMDB database)

 
1926 births
2009 deaths
20th-century Australian novelists
21st-century Australian novelists
Alumni of Lingnan University (Hong Kong)
Chinese emigrants to Australia
Chinese male novelists
People from Wuzhou
Writers from Guangxi
Writers from Sydney
Wuxia writers